Phillip P. Keene (born September 5, 1966) is an American actor. He is mostly known for playing Buzz Watson on the TV series The Closer and its spinoff, Major Crimes. He is fluent in Spanish and German.

His first film was Role of a Lifetime. Before acting, he went to UCLA and studied history/art history. He also has a pilot's license.

Personal life
He is married to James Duff, creator of The Closer and Major Crimes, his partner since 1993.

Filmography

Nominations

References

External links

American male television actors
American gay actors
University of California, Los Angeles alumni
Living people
1966 births
Place of birth missing (living people)